Benjamin B. Gunn (February 15, 1860 – December 9, 1907) was a Canadian politician.

Born in Wallacetown, Canada West, Gunn was educated in Wallacetown and was a merchant by profession. He was elected to the House of Commons of Canada for the electoral district of Huron South in the general elections of 1904. A Conservative, he died in office in 1907.

References
 
 The Canadian Parliament; biographical sketches and photo-engravures of the senators and members of the House of Commons of Canada. Being the tenth Parliament, elected November 3, 1904

1860 births
1907 deaths
Conservative Party of Canada (1867–1942) MPs
Members of the House of Commons of Canada from Ontario